Hemza Haloui (born 10 July 1994) is an Algerian Greco-Roman wrestler. At the 2016 Summer Olympics he competed in the Men's Greco-Roman -98 kg.

References

External links
 

Olympic wrestlers of Algeria
1994 births
Wrestlers at the 2016 Summer Olympics
Living people
African Games silver medalists for Algeria
African Games bronze medalists for Algeria
African Games medalists in wrestling
Algerian male sport wrestlers
Competitors at the 2015 African Games
Competitors at the 2019 African Games
21st-century Algerian people
20th-century Algerian people